Sapy may refer to the following places in Poland:
Sapy, Łódź Voivodeship
Sapy, Masovian Voivodeship
Sąpy, Elbląg County, Warmian-Masurian Voivodeship
Sąpy, Iława County, Warmian-Masurian Voivodeship